Mirnoye is a rural locality (a selo) in Prigorodny Selsoviet of Belogorsky District, Amur Oblast, Russia. The population was 227 as of 2018. There are 3 streets.

Geography 
Mirnoye is located 25 km south of Belogorsk (the district's administrative centre) by road. Vozzhayevka is the nearest rural locality.

References 

Rural localities in Belogorsky District